In the 2007–08 Elite One season, 16 teams competed. Cotonsport Garoua won the championship.

League standings

References
Cameroon - List of final tables (RSSSF)

Cam
1
1
Elite One seasons